Thyreocoris is an Old World genus of shield bug belonging to the family Thyreocoridae.

The genus was described in 1801 by Franz von Paula Schrank, but most of the historically included species are now classified in other genera, or other families.

Selected species
 Thyreocoris balcanicus Schumacher, 1918
 Thyreocoris fulvipennis (Dallas, 1851)
 Thyreocoris ohridanus Kormilev, 1936
 Thyreocoris scarabaeoides (Linnaeus, 1758)

References

Shield bugs